The Men's J. P. Morgan Tournament of Champions 2012 is the men's edition of the 2012 Tournament of Champions, which is a PSA World Series event Gold (prize money: $115,000). The event took place at the Grand Central Terminal in New York City in the United States from 20 January to 26 January. Nick Matthew won his first Tournament of Champions trophy, beating James Willstrop in the final.

Prize money and ranking points
For 2012, the prize purse was $115,000. The prize money and points breakdown is as follows:

Seeds

Draw and results

See also
Tournament of Champions (squash)
2012 Men's British Open

References

External links
PSA Tournament of Champions 2012 website
Tournament of Champions 2012 official website

Men's Tournament of Champions
Men's Tournament of Champions
Tournament of Champions (squash)